Wilhelm "Willi" Reinfrank (May 30, 1903 – 1943) was a German weightlifter who competed in the 1928 Summer Olympics.

He was born in Mannheim and died in the battle of Stalingrad.

In 1928, he finished fifth in the lightweight class.

References

External links
 

1903 births
1943 deaths
Sportspeople from Mannheim
German male weightlifters
Olympic weightlifters of Germany
Weightlifters at the 1928 Summer Olympics
World record setters in weightlifting
German Army personnel killed in World War II
People from the Grand Duchy of Baden
Missing in action of World War II
Military personnel from Mannheim